Computer case screws are the hardware used to secure parts of a PC to the case. Although there are numerous manufacturers of computer cases, they have generally used three thread sizes. The Unified Thread Standard (UTS) originates from the United States, while the ISO metric screw thread is standardized worldwide. In turn, these thread standards define preferred size combinations that are based on generic units—some on the inch and others on the millimetre.

The #6-32 UNC screws are often found on 3.5" hard disk drives and the case's body to secure the covers. The M3 threaded holes are often found on 5.25" optical disc drives, 3.5" floppy drives, and 2.5" drives. Motherboards and other circuit boards often use a #6-32 UNC standoff. #4-40 UNC thumb screws are often found on the ends of DVI, VGA, serial and parallel connectors.

More modern cases from certain manufacturers (Dell, Gateway) and enthusiast cases will lack screws altogether, instead utilizing a tool-less design.

#6-32 UNC screw 

The optional UNC specification indicates the standard coarse thread is used which is defined for #6 screws as 32 tpi rendering 'UNC' redundant, however it may be seen when other specifications such as plating or other treatments are also specified. It is by far the most common screw found inside computer cases. Nearly every brand new computer case comes with a bag of these. They are commonly used for the following purposes, however there are many exceptions:
 securing a power supply to the case
 securing a 3.5-inch hard disk drive to the case
 holding an expansion card in place by its metal slot cover
 fastening case components to one another
 usually, one or more #6-32 UNC screws hold the main cover on the case

They are almost always provided with a #2 Phillips drive. Sometimes a Green Robertson or Torx drive is used instead. All three patterns may also be combined with a slot for a flat-blade screwdriver. Usually they are provided with a 1/4 in  flanged hex head. Non-standard metricized  flanged hex heads can also be encountered. Also common are pan head screws - a low disk with a chamfered outer edge. Because they are used in places where high torque is not required and easy removal and replacement may be desirable (such as on the side panels of the PC case), they are frequently available as thumbscrews with larger, knurled heads that can be removed with one's fingers or tools.

M3 screw 

The M3 is the second most common screw found in PCs. It commonly appears in many lengths from 1 to 20 mm. Nearly every brand-new computer case comes with a bag of these. Notwithstanding many exceptions, they are commonly used for securing the following devices:
 5.25-inch optical disc drives
 2.5-inch hard disks and solid-state drive
 3.5-inch floppy drives

M3 screws typically accept a #2 Phillips screwdriver tip.

Motherboard standoff 

Most cases use threaded brass standoffs (Jack Screw Standoffs) for attaching the motherboard to the case chassis.  Because the case material is usually a conductive metal, attaching the motherboard directly to it can cause a short circuit.  Sometimes threaded or snap-lock plastic standoffs are used, which are less secure, but equally useful in a stationary computer. The standoff provides a margin of space between the motherboard and the case to keep the multiple solder points below from grounding and short-circuiting.

Usually, the standoff has a #6-32 UNC male thread on one end which screws into a threaded hole in the case or motherboard backplate and a #6-32 UNC female thread in the other end which accepts a screw to retain the motherboard. Less often, the standoff has a female thread in both ends and a second screw is used to attach it to the case. Some standoffs use the M3 female thread (which faces the motherboard) instead of #6-32 UNC, and on a rare occasion a mixture of types can be used in the same case.

All-metric standoffs are stated as threading x hex length x threaded length.  For example, M3 x 10 x 6 means a standoff with M3 male and female threading, 10 mm hex length, and 6 mm threaded length.  M6 x 10 x 8 means M6 male and female threading, 10 mm hex length, and 8 mm threaded length.  Typically, M2.5 and M3 standoffs tighten with a 5 mm socket, M4 standoffs with a 6 mm socket, M5 standoffs with a 7 mm socket, and M6 standoffs with an 8 mm socket, but this is not always the case.

Version 2.1 of the ATX specification states that the length of standoffs needs to be at least , with their cross sections fitting within  square areas centered around each mounting hole on ATX motherboards.

#4-40 UNC thumbscrews 
Pairs of #4-40 UNC thumbscrews are used to fasten certain connectors to hardware ports. The screws are typically located on either side of D-subminiature connectors such as on VGA, serial, parallel and legacy game controller ports. They are also more recently used on DVI connectors. Occasionally the 4-40 hexagonal standoffs come loose when loosening the 4-40 screws to remove a cable, gender changer, or adapter. The 4-40 standoffs typically tighten with a 5 mm or 3/16-inch socket. Care should be taken not to overtighten them as they are somewhat delicate and will snap off at the base with excessive torque.

Material
Steel is by far the most common material used, frequently with a plated or anodized finish. Other materials including brass, aluminum, nylon and various plastics are also used for applications with particular physical or aesthetic requirements.

Comparison
The #6-32 UNC is a thicker screw with a more coarse thread. This makes it more suitable for fastening larger parts and thicker materials requiring increased holding strength. Its larger size and coarse thread make it easier to work with during assembly, with less risk of cross threading. The integrated flange provides greater holding strength with less risk of pull through. The hex head makes it easier to work with during assembly with powered torque screwdrivers.

The M3 is a thinner screw with a finer thread than the #6-32 UNC. This makes it more suitable for fastening into smaller parts and thinner materials requiring good strength in a limited space. Its size and fine thread make it appropriate for applications where a #6-32 UNC would be excessively bulky without providing any other benefits versus the smaller M3.

Gallery

Example 
A regular computer case may require/include
 7 thumb screw 6-32 × 6 mm for 2.5” drive tray, expansion slots
 4 hexagon screw 6-32 × 6 mm for psu
 21 phillips screw 6-32 × 5 mm for motherboard, 3.5” harddisk tray
 12 phillips screw M3 × 5 mm for 2.5” harddrive
 16 KB5 x 10 mm for fans
 9 standoff 6-32 × 6.5 + 4 mm for motherboard
 1 positioning standoff 6-32 × 6.5 + 4 mm for motherboard

See also 
 Torx

References

External links 
 The 11 Tools Every System Builder Should Own (and screws) from crn.com

Computer enclosure
Screws